James Bauman Griffin (February 8, 1942 – February 22, 1995) was an American former football defensive end who played in the American Football League (AFL) for three seasons. He also played one year in the Canadian Football League (CFL) and spent two seasons in minor leagues.

Professional career 

A graduate of Grambling State, Griffin was chosen by the San Francisco 49ers in the 15th round of the 1964 NFL draft, but released in September of that year as the 49ers reduced their squad size to meet the league limit. He spent the 1964 season with the Joliet Explorers of the United Football League, and 1965 with the Toronto Argonauts of the CFL, appearing in three games for the latter. 

Griffin joined the AFL's San Diego Chargers in 1966, impressing head coach Sid Gillman enough with his pass rushing ability to be named in the starting line-up for their Week 2 game with the Boston Patriots. He appeared in every game throughout his two years in San Diego, starting 13 out of 28 games and being credited with three sacks. In 1968, the newly-formed Cincinnati Bengals selected Griffin after the Chargers made him available in the expansion draft. Griffin appeared in every game for the Bengals and started all but one. In the season finale against the Jets, he scored his  lone AFL touchdown, knocking the ball out of New York Jets running back Matt Snell's hands and recovering it himself in the end zone.

Griffin didn't play in the AFL again, as he was released by the Bengals shortly before the start of the 1969 season. He spent a single season with the Indianapolis Capitols of the Continental Football League, winning the league title, then retired.

Personal Life 
Griffin died on February 22, 1995, in Lake Charles, Louisiana.

Notes

References 

1942 births
1995 deaths
American football defensive ends
Players of American football from Louisiana
Sportspeople from Lake Charles, Louisiana
Grambling State Tigers football players
Canadian football defensive linemen
Players of Canadian football from Louisiana
San Francisco 49ers players
United Football League (1961–1964) players
Toronto Argonauts players
San Diego Chargers players
Cincinnati Bengals players
Continental Football League players